Ibrahim Makama Misau is a Nigerian politician. He is a retired and experienced senior Police office; he retired as Superintendent of Police [SP] where he served in many capacities with a high level of responsibilities at home and international assignment.

History 
Makama served as United Nations Police monitor at two different missions; United Nations Civilian Police and United Nations Police Support Group in Croatia Eastern Baranja Region, where he successfully completed his assignment with Outstanding Performance of United Nations rating. He was also awarded with two United Nations Medals.

Makama served as aide-de-camp (ADC) to two different Governors of Bauchi State and Kano State, his primary responsibility was to provide security to the Governor and his immediate family, and the Government House. As a General Duty Police Officer, he served as Divisional Crime Officer, Officer in Charge of Police Management Services Department of Kano State Police Command, and also Staff Officer at the same Command. He retired from the Police voluntarily after more than 11 years of meritorious service in 2005.

Immediately after his retirement, Makama joined active politics and won an election as Member House of Representatives from Misau/Dambam Federal Constituency of Bauchi State as a Parliamentarian. He served as Member Police Affairs Committee, and also Member National Security Committee from 2007 to 2011.

Makama is a successful businessman, and is serving as Director to many successful and reputable companies.

References

Nigerian politicians
Living people
Nigerian police chiefs
Year of birth missing (living people)